Sam Darbyshire (born 26 March 1989) is an English television actor best known for his role as Jamie "Fletch" Fletcher on the Channel 4 soap opera Hollyoaks. He has also appeared in several advertisements and had a small role in Coronation Street. He was a member of a local youth theatre group in Wigan, Willpower Youth Theatre, near his childhood home in Standish, Greater Manchester. In his final year of secondary school, Darbyshire was involved in a production of the musical Grease.

Darbyshire attended Winstanley College.

References

English male television actors
Place of birth missing (living people)
1989 births
Living people
People from Standish, Greater Manchester